The Detroit–Windsor tunnel, also known as the Detroit–Canada tunnel, is an international highway tunnel connecting the cities of Detroit, Michigan, United States and Windsor, Ontario, Canada. It is the second-busiest crossing between the United States and Canada, the first being the Ambassador Bridge, which also connects the two cities, which are situated on the Detroit River.

History

Construction 
The Detroit–Windsor tunnel was built by the firm Parsons, Klapp, Brinckerhoff and Douglas  (the same firm that built the Holland Tunnel). The executive engineer was Burnside A. Value, the engineer of design was Norwegian-American engineer Søren Anton Thoresen, while fellow Norwegian-American Ole Singstad consulted, and designed the ventilation.

The method used to construct the tunnel was immersed tube (sections of steel tube floated into place and sunk into a trench dug in the river bottom), as was done in the earlier Posey Tube. The tunnel sections have three main levels. The bottom level brings in fresh air under pressure, which is forced into the mid level, where the traffic lanes are located.  The ventilation systems forces vehicle exhaust into the third level, which is then vented at each end of the tunnel. The total cost of construction was approximately $25 million (around $ in  dollars).

The river section of the tunnel was connected to bored tunnels on both banks. Because the tunnel essentially sits on the river bottom, there is a wide no-anchor zone enforced on river traffic.

Completion in 1930 
The Detroit–Windsor tunnel was completed in 1930. It was the third underwater vehicular tunnel constructed in the United States, following the Holland Tunnel, between Jersey City, New Jersey, and downtown Manhattan, New York, and the Posey Tube, between Oakland and Alameda, California.

Its creation followed the opening of cross-border rail freight tunnels including the St. Clair Tunnel between Port Huron, Michigan, and Sarnia, Ontario, in 1891 and the Michigan Central Railway Tunnel between Detroit and Windsor in 1910.

The cities of Detroit and Windsor hold the distinction of jointly creating both the second and third tunnels between two nations in the world. The Detroit–Windsor tunnel is the world's third tunnel between two nations, and the first international vehicle tunnel. The Michigan Central Railway Tunnel, also under the Detroit River, was the second tunnel between two nations. The St. Clair Tunnel, between Port Huron, Michigan, and Sarnia, Ontario, under the St. Clair River, was the first.

Operations since 2007
In 2007, billionaire Manuel Moroun, owner of the nearby Ambassador Bridge, attempted to purchase the American side of the tunnel. In 2008, the City of Windsor controversially attempted to purchase the American side for $75 million, but the deal fell through after a scandal involving then-Detroit Mayor Kwame Kilpatrick.

Soon afterward, the city's finances were badly hit in a recession and the tunnel's future was in question. Following Detroit's July 2013 bankruptcy filing, Windsor Mayor Eddie Francis said that his city would consider purchasing Detroit's half of the tunnel if it was offered for sale.

On July 25, 2013, the lessor, manager and operator of the tunnel, Detroit Windsor Tunnel LLC, and its parent company, American Roads, LLC, voluntarily filed for chapter 11 bankruptcy protection in the United States Bankruptcy Court for the Southern District of New York.  The American lease was eventually purchased by Syncora Guarantee, a Bermuda-based insurance company. Soon afterward, the lease with Detroit was extended to 2040. Both Syncora and Windsor retained the Windsor-Detroit Tunnel Corporation to manage the daily operations and upkeep of the tunnel. In May 2018, Syncora sold its interest in American Roads, LLC for $220 million to DIF Capital Partners, a Dutch-based investment fund management company specializing in infrastructure assets.

A $21.6 million renovation of the tunnel began in October 2017 to replace the aging concrete ceiling, along with other improvements to the infrastructure. Completion of the project was initially scheduled for June 2018, but is ongoing as of 2021.

Usage 
The Detroit–Windsor tunnel crosses the Canada–United States border; an International Boundary Commission plaque marking the boundary in the tunnel is between flags of the two countries. The tunnel is the second-busiest crossing between the United States and Canada after the nearby Ambassador Bridge. A 2004 Border Transportation Partnership study showed that 150,000 jobs in the region and $13 billion (U.S.) in annual production depend on the Windsor-Detroit international border crossing. Between 2001 and 2005, profits from the tunnel peaked, with the cities receiving over $6 million annually. A steep decline in traffic eliminated profits from the tunnel from 2008 until 2012, with a modest recovery in the years since.

Traffic 
About 13,000 vehicles a day use the tunnel despite having one lane in each direction and not allowing large trucks. Historically, the tunnel carried a smaller amount of commercial traffic than other nearby crossings because of physical and cargo restraints, as well as limits on accessing roadways. Passenger automobile traffic on the tunnel increased from 1972, until it peaked in 1999 at just under 10 million vehicle crossings annually. After 1999, automobile crossings on tunnel declined, dropping under 5 million for the first time in over three decades in 2007. Traffic on the tunnel later recovered slightly in the following years when the economy began to improve after 2008.

Tolls
Tolls were last increased on the Canadian side in July 2021, 37% for those using Canadian currency and 11% using American currency. Standard tolls for non-commercial Canada-bound vehicles are $5 USD and $6.25 CAD; United States-bound tolls are also $5 USD but $6.50 CAD. For frequent crossers, the Nexpress Toll Card for cheaper rates. Commercial vehicles and buses are charged higher rates. Motorcycles, scooters and bicycles are prohibited.

Features

Tunnel truck for disabled vehicles
When the tunnel first opened in the 1930s the operators had a unique rescue vehicle to tow out disabled vehicles without having to back in or turn around to perform this role.  The vehicle had two drivers, one facing in the opposite direction of the other.  The vehicle was driven in, the disabled vehicle was hooked up, then the driver facing the other way drove it out.  This emergency vehicle also had  of water hose with power drive and chemical fire extinguishers.

CKLW, WJR and the tunnel
In the late 1960s, Windsor radio station CKLW AM 800 engineered a wiring setup which has allowed the station's signal to be heard clearly by automobiles traveling through the tunnel.  Currently Detroit radio station WJR AM 760 can be heard clearly in the tunnel.

Ventilation
The upper and lower levels of the tunnel are used as exhaust and intake air ducts.  One hundred-foot ventilation towers on both ends of the tunnel enable air exchange once every 90 seconds.

Photo gallery

See also
 Ambassador Bridge
 Gordie Howe International Bridge, a second bridge crossing currently under construction
 Detroit International Riverfront
 Transportation in metropolitan Detroit
 Detroit–Windsor

References

External links

 Windsor Detroit Borderlink Limited (Windsor Plaza)
 Detroit Windsor Tunnel LLC (Detroit Plaza)
 Tunnel Bus
 Windsor International Airport – wiki
 Windsor International Airport – official website
 Camera of the tunnel
 Detroit News archives: The Building of the Detroit–Windsor Tunnel

Transport in Windsor, Ontario
Transportation buildings and structures in Detroit
Tunnels in Michigan
Road tunnels in Ontario
Detroit River
Toll tunnels in the United States
Canada–United States border crossings
Historic Civil Engineering Landmarks
Tunnels completed in 1930
Buildings and structures in Windsor, Ontario
Toll tunnels in Canada
Articles containing video clips
Road tunnels in the United States
Immersed tube tunnels in Canada
Immersed tube tunnels in the United States
International tunnels
1930 establishments in Michigan
1930 establishments in Ontario